Seemanthini is a 1936 Indian Tamil-language film directed by Ellis R. Dungan and starring T. P. Rajalakshmi. It was Dungan's third film as director.

References

External links 
 

1936 films
1930s Tamil-language films
Films directed by Ellis R. Dungan
Indian black-and-white films